Shoshana Netanyahu (6 April 1923 – 7 October 2022) was an Israeli judge and lawyer who was a justice at the Supreme Court of Israel. She was married to mathematician Elisha Netanyahu (1912–1986), who was the uncle of Benjamin Netanyahu, current Prime Minister of Israel.

Biography 
Netanyahu was born Shoshana Shenburg in 1923, in the Free City of Danzig (now Gdańsk, Poland). She immigrated to Palestine with her family in 1924, and settled in the Bat Galim neighborhood of Haifa.  She graduated from the Reali High School in Haifa 1941, and took British Mandate-operated legal classes.

Netanyahu worked at the law firm of S. Horowitz, and then spent a year serving as assistant prosecutor in the Israel Air Force. She returned to her previous position, and two years later moved to the advocate firm, Friedman and Komisar.

In 1949, she married professor Elisha Netanyahu; their elder son was born in 1951. In 1953 the family left for a sabbatical at Stanford University, where their second son was born.

In 1960 she returned to Friedman and Komisar. In 1969 she was appointed a judge on the Magistrates Court in Haifa and from 1974 to 1981 she served as a Haifa District Court judge. In 1981, she became the second female Israel Supreme Court justice, after Miriam Ben-Porat's retirement. She retired from the Supreme Court in 1993. During her tenure, she also headed a national committee on health care in Israel from 1988 to 1990, which led to major legislative changes.

Following her retirement from the bench, Netanyahu was an adjunct lecturer at the University of Haifa (1993–1998) and at the Hebrew University of Jerusalem (1993–2002). In 1993, she received the Women’s League for Conservative Judaism award. She received an honorary doctorate from the University of Haifa in 1997. In 2002 she was made an honorary citizen of Jerusalem.

Netanyahu had two children: Nathan (b. 1951), a professor of computer science at Bar-Ilan University, and Dan (b. 1954), an information systems auditor.

References

External links 
  
 Martin Edelman, "The Judicial Elite of Israel", International Political Science Review, Vol. 13, No. 3 (July 1992), pp. 235–248. 
 Shmuel Penchas, Mordechai Shani, "Redesigning a national health-care system: the Israeli experience", International Journal of Health Care Quality Assurance, volume 8 (1995), issue 2, pp. 9–17.

1923 births
2022 deaths
20th-century Israeli lawyers
21st-century Israeli lawyers
Israeli people of Polish-Jewish descent
Israeli women judges
Israeli women lawyers
Judges of the Supreme Court of Israel
Lawyers from Haifa
Shoshana
Polish emigrants to Mandatory Palestine
20th-century women lawyers
21st-century women lawyers
20th-century women judges
20th-century Israeli judges